Eric Schaaf (born 29 May 1990) is a German footballer who plays as a midfielder for SV Sandhausen.

References

External links
 
 Eric Schaaf at Kicker

German footballers
1990 births
Living people
Borussia Mönchengladbach II players
SC Fortuna Köln players
VfR Mannheim players
SV Sandhausen players
Association football midfielders
2. Bundesliga players